Mar Eliya XIV [XIII] Abulyonan  (or Abolionan) (1840 - June 27, 1894) was the patriarch of the Chaldean Catholic Church from 1878 to 1894.

Life
Eliya Peter Abulyonan was born in 1840 in Mosul to an Assyrian family. He studied three years in the College of the Propaganda in Rome and was ordained priest in 1865. On May 24, 1874, in Alqosh, he was ordained bishop of Gazireh by Patriarch Joseph Audo. He was appointed Patriarch of the Chaldean Catholic Church on July 26, 1878, and confirmed by the pope on February 28, 1879.

During his patriarchate he spared no effort to improve the relations both with the Holy See and within the Chaldean Church, after the eventful reign of his predecessor Joseph Audo. He died in Mosul at the age of 54 on June 27, 1894.

The ordinal number of his title is sometime XIV, sometime XIII, while among scholars Eliya XII is often preferred. This is due to the uncertain list of the patriarchal line of Alqosh in the 16th and 17th centuries.

Notes

References
 
 
 

 

Assyrians from the Ottoman Empire
Chaldean Catholic Patriarchs of Babylon
1840 births
1894 deaths
People from Mosul
19th-century Eastern Catholic archbishops
Ottoman expatriates in Italy
Eastern Catholic bishops in the Ottoman Empire
19th-century people of Ottoman Iraq